Punan Merap (Mbraa) is a purported minor Austronesian language of Borneo in Indonesia.

Soriente (2015) classifies Mbraa (also known as Merap) as a Kayan–Murik (Modang-Bahau) language.

Phonology 
Merap phonology has departed significantly from Proto-Malayo Polynesian. Merap stress is word-final, and word shape is sesquisyllabic (a minor penultimate syllable followed by a stressed full ultima). The number of vowel contrasts has increased significantly as well. Where Proto-Malayo-Polynesian had four vowels (*i, *u, *a, and schwa) Merap has well over twenty contrasts, including diphthongs, triphthongs, and nasality distinctions.

References
Notes

Sources
Soriente, Antonia. 2015. Mbraa: A Modang-Bahau language? Presentation given at 13-ICAL, Academia Sinica, Taipei, Taiwan.

Kayan–Murik languages
Languages of Indonesia
Endangered Austronesian languages